Thomas or Tom Nichols may refer to:

Thomas Nichols (pirate) (fl. 1717–1718), pirate in the Caribbean and off the American east coast
Thomas Reid Nichols (born 1958), American baseball player
Tom Nichols (footballer) (born 1993), English footballer
Tom Nichols (academic) (born 1960), American academic
Thomas E. Nichols, American statistician

See also 
 Thomas Nichols Three Deckers, historic houses in Taunton, Massachusetts, United States
 Thomas Nicholls (disambiguation)
 Nichols (surname)
 Nichols (disambiguation)